The Delaware United States House election for 1798 was held on October 2, 1798. The incumbent Representative James A. Bayard Sr. won reelection.

Results

References

Delaware
1798
1798 Delaware elections